Klayman is a British surname, indicating one's ancestors were involved into Clay mining or construction formerly.

Notable people with the name Klayman include:

 Larry Klayman (born 1951), US-American lawyer and former U.S. Justice Department prosecutor.

See also 
 Klayman v. Obama
 Clay
 Clayman
 Clay Mann

Surnames of English origin
English-language surnames
Occupational surnames